Well-known authors of novels, listed by country:

See also: Lists of authors, List of poets, List of playwrights, List of short story authors

Afghanistan

Aliyeh Ataei (born 1981)
Khaled Hosseini (born 1965)
Jamil Jan Kochai (born 1992)
Akram Osman (1937–2016)
Nemat Sadat

Rahnaward Zaryab (1944–2020)

Albania

Dritero Agolli (1931–2017)
Ismail Kadare (born 1936)
Fatos Kongoli (born 1944)
Faik Konitza (1875–1942)
Migjeni (1911–1938)
Haki Stermilli (1895–1953)
Jakov Xoxa (1923–1979)

Algeria

Marguerite Taos Amrouche (1913–1976)
Rachid Boudjedra (born 1941)
Albert Camus (1913–1960)
Mohammed Dib (1920–2003)
Tahar Djaout (1954–1993)
Assia Djebar (1936–2015)
Frantz Fanon (1925–1961), originally from Martinique
Mouloud Feraoun (1913–1962)
Mouloud Mammeri (1917–1989)
Rachid Mimouni (1945–1995)
Ahlam Mostaghanemi (born 1953)
Leïla Sebbar (born 1941)
Kateb Yacine (1929–1989)

Roman Empire|Ancient Latin authors

Apuleius (c. 124–c. 170)
Petronius (c. 27–66)

Angola

José Eduardo Agualusa (born 1960)
Sousa Jamba (born 1966)
Ondjaki (born 1977)
Pepetela (born 1941)
Oscar Ribas (1909–2004)
Manuel Rui (born 1941)
José Luandino Vieira (born 1935)

Antigua and Barbuda

Joanne C. Hillhouse (born 1973)
Marie-Elena John
Jamaica Kincaid (born 1949)

Argentina

Marcos Aguinis (born 1935)
César Aira (born 1949)
Adolfo Bioy Casares (1914–1999)
Abelardo Castillo (1935–2017)
Julio Cortázar (1914–1984)
Macedonio Fernandez (1874–1952)
Ricardo Güiraldes (1886–1927)
Sylvia Iparraguirre (born 1947)
Leopoldo Marechal (1900–1970)
Manuel Puig (1932–1990)
Andrés Rivera (1928–2016)
Juan José Saer (1937–2005)
Ernesto Sábato (1911–2011)
Luisa Valenzuela (born 1938)
Jorge Luis Borges (1899–1986)

Armenia

Michael Arlen (1895–1956)
Zori Balayan (born 1935)
Ruben Hovsepyan (1939–2016)
Levon Khechoyan (1955–014)
Yervant Odian (1869–1926)
Alexander Shirvanzade (1858–1935)
Zabel Yesayan (1878–1943)

Assyria

Khalil Gibran (1883–1931)
Thea Halo (born 1941)
Ivan Kakovitch (1933–2006)
Rosie Malek-Yonan (born 1965)
Obelit Yadgar (born 1945)

Australia

Austria

Vicki Baum (1888–1960)
Hugo Bettauer (1872–1925)
Thomas Bernhard (1931–1989)
Hermann Broch (1886–1951)
Peter Handke (born 1942)
Josef Haslinger (born 1955)
Elfriede Jelinek (born 1946)
Robert Musil (1880–1942)
Joseph Roth (1894–1939)
Robert Schneider (born 1961)
Arthur Schnitzler (1862–1931)
Bertha von Suttner (1843–1914)
Stefan Zweig (1881–1942)

Azerbaijan

Akram Aylisli (born 1937)
Alaviyya Babayeva (1921–2014)
Afag Masud (born 1957)
Elchin Safarli (born 1984)
Kurban Said

Bangladesh

Humayun Ahmed (1948–2012)
Shaheen Akhtar (born 1962)
Monica Ali (born 1967)
Tahmima Anam (born 1975)
Humayun Azad (1947–2004)
Dilara Hashem (1935–2022)
Taslima Nasrin (born 1962)
Kazi Nazrul Islam (1899–1976)
Rizia Rahman (1939–2019)
Muhammad Yunus (born 1940)

Barbados

Austin Clarke (1934–2016)
Geoffrey Drayton (1924–2017)
J. B. Emtage (1902–1995) 
Agymah Kamau
Anthony Kellman (born 1955)

Odimumba Kwamdela (1942–2019)
George Lamming (1927–2022)
Karen Lord
Glenville Lovell (born 1955)

Belarus

Vasil Bykaŭ (1924–2003)
Uładzimir Karatkievič (1930–1984)
Jakub Kołas (Kanstancy Mickievič) (1882–1956)
Janka Kupała (Ivan Łucevič) (1882–1942)
Ivan Šamiakin (1921–2004)

Belgium

Nicolas Ancion (born 1971)
Cornelis de Bie (1627–c. 1715)
Louis Paul Boon (1912–1979)
Hendrik Conscience (1812–1883)
Ernest Claes (1885–1968)
Hugo Claus (1929–2008)
Christine D'Haen (1923–2009)
Johan Daisne (1912–1978)
Charles De Coster (1827–1879)
Willem Elsschot (1882–1960)
Jef Geeraerts (1930–2015)
Guido Gezelle (1830–1899)
Marnix Gijsen (1899–1984)
Hubert Lampo (1920–2006)
Rosalie Loveling (1834–1875)
Virginie Loveling (1836–1923)
Maurice Maeterlinck (1862–1949)
Alice Nahon (1896–1933)
Amélie Nothomb (born 1966)
Anne Provoost (born 1964)
Maria Rosseels (1916–2005)
Georges Simenon (1903–1989)
Stijn Streuvels (1871–1969)
Herman Teirlinck (1879–1967)
Felix Timmermans (1886–1947)
André Henri Constant van Hasselt (1806–1874)
Karel Van Mander (1548–1606)
Emile Verhaeren (1855–1916)
Peter Verhelst (born 1962)
Gerard Walschap (1898–1989)
Jan Frans Willems (1793–1846)
Marguerite Yourcenar (1903–1987)
Lode Zielens (1901–1944)

Belize 

 Zee Edgell (1940–2020)
 Evan X Hyde  (born 1947)
 John Alexander Watler (1938–2015)
 Colville Young (born 1932)
 Edward Broaster
 Emory King (1931–2007)

Benin

Berte-Evelyne Agbo (see also Senegal)
Florent Couao-Zotti (born 1964)
Richard Dogbeh (see also Togo, Senegal and Ivory Coast)
Adélaïde Fassinou (born 1955)

Bermuda

Angela Barry
Brian Burland (1931–2010)

Bolivia

Bosnia and Herzegovina

Ivo Andrić (1892–1975)
Andrej Nikolaidis (born 1974)
Meša Selimović (1910–1982)

Botswana

Caitlin Davies (born 1964), born in Britain
Unity Dow (born 1959)
Bessie Head (1937–1986), born in South Africa
Andrew Sesinyi (born 1952)
Mositi Torontle (born 1964)

Brazil

José Alencar (1931–2011)
Manuel Antônio de Almeida (1831–1861)
Jorge Amado (1912–2001)
Mário de Andrade (1893–1945)
Oswald de Andrade (1890–1954)
Machado de Assis (1839–1908)
Lima Barreto (1881–1922)
Chico Buarque (born 1944)
Lúcio Cardoso (1912–1968)
Paulo Coelho (born 1947)
Rubem Fonseca (1925–2020)
Clarice Lispector (1920–1977)
Joaquim Manoel de Macedo (1820–1882)
Raduan Nassar (born 1935)
Raul Pompéia (1863–1895)
Fernando Sabino (1923–2004)
Moacyr Scliar (1935–2011)
Graciliano Ramos (1892–1953)
José Lins do Rego (1901–1957)
João Ubaldo Ribeiro (1941–2014)
João Guimarães Rosa (1908–1967)
Murilo Rubião (1916–1991)
Érico Veríssimo (1905–1975)
Lygia Fagundes Telles (1923–1922)

Bulgaria

Emil Andreev (born 1956)
Zdravka Evtimova (born 24 July 1959)
Agop Melkonyan (1949–2006)
Albena Stambolova (born 1957)

Burkina Faso

Nazi Boni (1909–1969)
Sarah Bouyain (born 1968)
Norbert Zongo (1949–1998)

Cameroon

Marie-Thérèse Assiga Ahanda (c.1941–2014) 
Francis Bebey (1929–2001)
Mongo Beti, pseudonym of Alexandre Biyidi Awala (1932–2001)
Calixthe Beyala (born 1961)
Mbella Sonne Dipoko (1936–2009)
Frieda Ekotto
Jean-Louis Njemba Medu (1902-1966)
Ferdinand Oyono (1929–2010)
René Philombé (1930–2001)

Canada

Rebecca Agatha Armour (1845–1891)
Margaret Atwood (born 1939)
Irene Baird (1901–1981)
Mary Balogh (born 1944)
Pierre Berton (1920–2004)
Marie-Claire Blais (1939–2021)
Morley Callaghan (1903–1990)
Deborah Joy Corey (born 1958)
Robertson Davies (1913–1995)
Ranj Dhaliwal (born 1976)
Réjean Ducharme (1941–2017)
Louis Emond (born 1969)
Musharraf Ali Farooqi (born 1968)
Timothy Findley (1930–2002) (See also France)
Gayleen Froese (born 1972)
Donald Jack (1924–2003)
Hugh MacLennan (1907–1990)
Margaret Laurence (1926–1987)
Stephen Leacock (1869–1944)
Yann Martel (born 1963)
Rohinton Mistry (born 1952)
Lucy Maud Montgomery (1874–1942)
Susanna Moodie (1803–1885)
Christopher G. Moore (born 1952)
Farley Mowat (1921–2014)
Alice Munro (born 1931)
Michael Ondaatje (born 1943)
Michèle Plomer (born 1965)
Mordecai Richler (1931–2001)
Gabrielle Roy (1909–1983)
Margaret Marshall Saunders (1861–1947)
Carol Shields (1935–2003)
Catharine Parr Traill (1802–1899)
Roland Michel Tremblay (born 1972)
Jane Urquhart (born 1949)

Cape Verde

Germano Almeida (born 1945)
Manuel Lopes (1907–2005)

Catalonia

Raimon Llull (1235–1315)
Ramon Muntaner (c. 1270–1336)
Joanot Martorell (1413–1468)
Narcís Oller (1846–1930)
Mercè Rodoreda (1909–1983)

Chad

Marie-Christine Koundja (born 1957)

Chile

Isabel Allende (born 1942)
Roberto Bolaño (1953–2003)
Francisco Coloane (1910–2002)
José Donoso (1924–1996)
Jorge Edwards (born 1931)
Baldomero Lillo (1867–1923)
Manuel Rojas (1924–1993)
Luis Sepúlveda (1949–2020)
Marcela Serrano (born 1951)
Mercedes Valdivieso (1924–1993)

China

Cao Xueqin (c. 1715–1763)
Dai Sijie (born 1954)
Gao Xingjian (born 1940)
Han Shaogong (born 1953)
Lao She (1899–1966)
Li Yu (1610–1680)
Lu Xun (1881–1936)
Mao Dun (1896–1981)
Mo Yan (born 1955)
Qian Zhongshu (1910–1998)
Wang Shuo (born 1958)
Wei Jingsheng (born 1950)
Zhang Ailing (1920–1995)

Colombia

Héctor Abad Faciolince (born 1958)
Jaime Manrique (born 1949)
Gabriel García Márquez (1927–2014)
José Eustasio Rivera (1888–1928)
Álvaro Mutis (1923–2013)

Republic of the Congo

Emmanuel Dongala (born 1941)
Paul Lomami-Tshibamba (1914–1985)
Henri Lopes (born 1937)
Alain Mabanckou (born 1966)
Jeannette Balou Tchichelle (1947–2005)

Democratic Republic of the Congo
(formerly Zaïre)

Amba Bongo
Maguy Kabamba (born 1960)
Sony Labou Tansi (1947–1995)
V. Y. Mudimbe (born 1941)
Yamusangie, Frederick Kambemba

Cosmopolitanism|Cosmopolitan

Romain Gary, Russian-born French writer
Franz Kafka (1883–1924), lived in Prague during Austria-Hungary and Czechoslovakia; German language writer; see also German literature
Arthur Koestler (1905–1983)
Milan Kundera (born 1929), born in Czechoslovakia, but moved to France. Multi-language writer.
Salman Rushdie (born 1947), born in India, but moved abroad later. English language writer, author of The Satanic Verses

Costa Rica

Fabián Dobles Rodríguez (1918–1997)
Joaquín García Monge (1881–1958)
Yolanda Oreamuno (1916–1956)
Roxana Pinto

Côte d'Ivoire|Ivory Coast

Tanella Boni (born 1954)
Micheline Coulibaly (1950–2003)
Bernard Dadié (1916–2019)
Richard Dogbeh (1932–2003). See also Benin, Senegal and Togo
Fatou Keïta (born 1965)
Ahmadou Kourouma (1927–2003)
Werewere-Liking Gnepo (born 1950). See also Cameroon
Véronique Tadjo (born 1955)

Croatia

Marija Jurić Zagorka (1873–1957)
Miroslav Krleža (1893–1981)
Zlata Kolarić-Kišur (1894–1990)
Ivo Andrić (1892–1975)
Ivan Aralica (born 1930)
Vesna Krmpotić (1932–2018)
Tomislav Ladan (1932–2008)
Dubravka Ugrešić (1949–2023)
Julijana Matanović (born 1959)

Cuba

Reinaldo Arenas (1943–1990)
Alejo Carpentier (1904–1980)
Daína Chaviano (born 1957)
José Lezama Lima (1910–1976)
Leonardo Padura Fuentes (born 1955)

Czech Republic

Karel Čapek (1890–1938)
Jaroslav Hašek (1883–1923)
Bohumil Hrabal (1914–1997)
Milan Kundera (born 1929)
Jaroslav Seifert (1901–1986)

Denmark

Hans Christian Andersen (1805–1875)
Karen Blixen (1885–1962) (pen name: Isak Dinesen), author of Seven Gothic Tales (1934), Out of Africa (1937)
Peter Høeg (born 1957)
Jens Peter Jacobsen (1847–1885)
Johannes Vilhelm Jensen (1873–1950), Nobel Prize for Literature (1944)
Christian Jungersen (born 1962)
Morten Korch (1876–1954)
Carl Erik Soya (1896–1983)

Djibouti

Waberi Abdourahman (born 1965)

Ecuador

Jorge Enrique Adoum (1926–2009)
Rosalía Arteaga (born 1956)
Aminta Buenaño (born 1958)
Benjamín Carrión (1897–1979)
Ileana Espinel (1933–2001)
María Fernanda Espinosa (born 1964)
Enrique Gil Gilbert (1912–1973)
Jorge Icaza (1906–1978)
Salomon Isacovici (1924–1998)
Edna Iturralde (born 1948)
Violeta Luna (born 1943)
José Martínez Queirolo (1931–2008)
Nela Martínez (1912–2004)
Juan Montalvo (1832–1889)
Gonzalo Zaldumbide (1884–1965)

Egypt

Alifa Rifaat (1930–1996)
Ahdaf Soueif (born 1950)
Bahaa Taher (born 1935)
Edward al-Kharrat (1926–2015)
Ibrahim Aslan (1935–2012)
Gamal Al-Ghitani (1945–2015)
Khairy Shalaby (1938–2011)
Muhammad Husayn Haykal (1888–1956)
Nabil Farouk (1956–2020)
Naguib Mahfouz (1911–2006), Nobel Prize for Literature (1988), famous for the Cairo Trilogy about life in the sprawling inner city.
Nawal El Saadawi (1931–2021)
Saleh Morsi (1939–1996)
Sonallah Ibrahim (born 1937)
Tawfiq al-Hakim (1898–1987)
Yahya Haqqi (1905–1992)
Youssef Ziedan (born 1958)
Yusuf Idris (1927–1991)

Equatorial Guinea

María Nsué Angüe (1945–2017)
Donato Ndongo-Bidyogo (born 1950)
Juan Tomás Ávila Laurel (born 1966)

Estonia

Sass Henno (born 1982)
Kaur Kender (born 1971)
Albert Kivikas (1898–1978)
Andrus Kivirähk (born 1970)
Jaan Kross (1920–2007)
Leo Kunnas (born 1967)
Juhan Liiv (1864–1913)
Tõnu Õnnepalu (a.k.a. Emil Tode, born 1962)
Kersti Merilaas (1913–1986)
Lilli Promet (1922–2007)
Karl Ristikivi (1912–1977)
Raivo Seppo (born 1973)
Juhan Smuul (1922–1971)
A. H. Tammsaare (1878–1940)
Enn Vetemaa (1936–2017)
Heiki Vilep (born 1960)

Ethiopia

Haddis Alemayehu (1910–2003)
Āfawarq Gabra Iyasus (1868–1947)
Moges Kebede
Dinaw Mengestu (born 1978)
Maaza Mengiste (born 1971)
Nega Mezlekia (born 1958)
Hama Tuma (born 1949)
Berhanu Zerihun (1933/4–1987)

Faroe Islands

Finland

Juhani Aho (1861–1921)
Tove Jansson (1914–2001), she wrote in Swedish
Aino Kallas (1878–1956), female
Aleksis Kivi (1834–1872)
Väinö Linna (1920–1992)
Johannes Linnankoski (1869–1913)
Arto Paasilinna (1942–2018) 
Kalle Päätalo (1919–2000)
Frans Emil Sillanpää (1888–1964), Nobel Prize for Literature, 1939
Mika Waltari (1908–1979)

France

Gabon

Jean-Baptiste Abessolo (born 1932)
Bessora (born in Belgium) (born 1968)
Charline Effah (born 1977)
Rene Maran, born near Martinique (1887–1960)
Chantal Magalie Mbazo'o-Kassa (born 1967)
Nadia Origo (born 1977)
Angèle Ntyugwetondo Rawiri (1954–2010)

Gambia

Ebou Dibba (1943–2000)
Ramatoulie Othman
Lenrie Peters (1932–2009)
Sally Singhateh (born 1977)

Germany

Heinrich Böll (1917–1985)
Alfred Döblin (1878–1957), author of Berlin Alexanderplatz
Hans Fallada (1893–1947)
Theodor Fontane (1819–1898)
Johann Wolfgang von Goethe (1749–1832), polymath
Günter Grass (1927–2015), Nobel Prize for Literature (1999)
Wolfgang Hildesheimer (1916–1991)
Hermann Hesse (1877–1962), Nobel Prize for Literature (1946)
Uwe Johnson (1934–1984)
Ernst Jünger (1895–1998)
Marie Luise Kaschnitz (1901–974)
Daniel Kehlmann (born 1975)
Heinrich von Kleist (1777–1811)
Siegfried Lenz (1926–2014)
Andreas Mand (born 1959)
Heinrich Mann (1871–1950)
Thomas Mann (1875–1955), Nobel Prize for Literature (1929)
Sten Nadolny (born 1942), author of The Discovery of Slowness
Erich Maria Remarque (1898–1970), author of Im Westen nichts Neues, or All Quiet on the Western Front (1929)
Bernhard Schlink (born 1944)
W. G. Sebald (1944–2001)
Anna Seghers (1900–1983)
Patrick Süskind (born 1949), author of Perfume
Martin Walser (born 1927)
Peter Weiss (1916–1982)
Christa Wolf (1929–2011)
Arnold Zweig (1887–1968)

Ghana

Nana Achampong (born 1964)
Ama Ata Aidoo (born 1940)
Ayi Kwei Armah (born 1939)
Bediako Asare, also connected with Tanzania
Ayesha Harruna Attah (born 1983)
Nana Oforiatta Ayim
Kofi Awoonor (1935–2013)
Yaba Badoe (born 1955)
Elizabeth-Irene Baitie (born 1970)
Kofi Batsa (1931–1991)
J. Benibengor Blay (born 1915)
William Boyd (born 1952)
Akosua Busia (born 1966)
J. E. Casely-Hayford (1866–1930)
Jojo Cobbinah (born 1948)
Meri Nana-Ama Danquah (born 1967)
Amma Darko (born 1956)
Lawrence Darmani (born 1956)
Kwame Dawes (born 1962)
Amu Djoleto (born 1929)
Cameron Duodu (born 1937)
Asare Konadu (1932–1994)
B. Kojo Laing (1946–2017)
Lesley Lokko
Nii Ayikwei Parkes (born 1974)
Kobina Sekyi (1892–1956)
Taiye Selasi (born 1979)
Francis Selormey (1927–1988)
Efua Theodora Sutherland (1924–1996)

Greece

Aris Alexandrou (1922–1979)

Errikos Belies (1950–2016) 

Dimitrios Hatzis (1913–1981)
Andreas Karkavitsas (1866–1922) 
Nikos Kazantzakis (1883–1957)
George Leonardos (born 1937)
Pavlos Matesis (1933–2013) 

Alexis Stamatis (born 1960)
Angelos Terzakis (1907–1979)

Vassilis Vassilikos (born 1934)
Elias Venezis (1904–973)

Guatemala

Miguel Ángel Asturias (1899–1974)
Javier Cárcamo Guzmán (born 1980)
Carlos Wyld Ospina (1891–1956)
Javier Payeras (born 1974)

Máximo Soto Hall

Carol Zardetto

Guinea

Sirah Balde de Labe
Camara Laye (1928–1980)
Tierno Monénembo (born 1947)
Williams Sassine (1944–1997)

Haïti

Frankétienne (born 1936)
Clark Parent (born 1951)
Jacques Roumain (1907–1944)

Honduras

Roberto Castillo (1950–2008)
Julio Escoto (born 1944)
Javier Abril Espinoza (born 1967)
Lucila Gamero (1873–1964)

Hong Kong 

Louis Cha (1924–2018)
Ni Kuang (born 1935)

Hungary

Zoltán Ambrus (1861–1932)
Mihály Babits (1883–1941)
Zsófia Bán (born 1957)
Miklós Bánffy (1873–1950)
Ágota Bozai (born 1965)
György Dalos (born 1943)
Anna Dániel (1908–2003)
József Eötvös (1813–1871)
Péter Esterházy (1950–2016)
Klára Fehér (1919–1996)
István Fekete (1900–1970), author of Vuk
Géza Gárdonyi (1863–1922)
Ágnes Gergely (born 1933)
Ferenc Herczeg (1863–1954)
Éva Janikovszky (1926–2003), also children's writer
Mór Jókai (1825–1904), foremost 19th-century novelist
Margit Kaffka (1880–1918)
Frigyes Karinthy (1887–1938), author of science-fiction novels
József Kármán (1768–1795)
Zsigmond Kemény (1814–1875)
Rivka Keren (born 1946), writing also in Hebrew
Imre Kertész (1929–2016), Nobel Prize for Literature (2002)
János Kodolányi (1899–1969)
György Konrád (1933–2019)
Károly Kós (1883–1977)
Dezső Kosztolányi (1885–1936)
László Krasznahorkai (born 1954)
Gyula Krúdy (1878–1933)
Ervin Lázár (1936–2006), author of children's novels
Laura Leiner (born 1985), author of young-adult series
Iván Mándy (1918–1995), author of children's novels
Sándor Márai (1900–1989)
Ferenc Molnár (1878–1952), author of The Paul Street Boys
Ferenc Móra (1879–1934)
Zsigmond Móricz (1879–1942), foremost novelist of the earlier 20th century
Kálmán Mikszáth (1847–1910)
Terézia Mora (born 1971), writing in German
Péter Nádas (born 1942)
Borbála Nádasdy (born 1939)
László Németh (1901–1975)
Emma Orczy (Baroness Orczy, 1865–1947), writing in English
Géza Ottlik (1912–1990)
Jenő Rejtő (1905–1943)
Henriett Seth F. (born 1980), science-fiction author
Magda Szabó (1917–2007), author of The Door
Sándor Szathmári (1897–1974), author of Kazohinia
Noémi Szécsi (born 1976)
Júlia Székely (1906–1986)
Mária Szepes (1908–2007)
Antal Szerb (1901–1945), author of Journey by Moonlight
Edina Szvoren (born 1974)
Áron Tamási (1897–1966)
Kata Tisza (born 1980)
Cécile Tormay (1876–1937)
Albert Wass (1908–1998)

Iceland

Snorri Sturluson (1179–1241), author of the Younger Edda
Halldór Laxness (1902–1998), Nobel Prize for Literature (1955)
Sjón (born 1962), The Nordic Council's Literature Prize (2005)

Indian subcontinent

Aravind Adiga (born 1974), English
Ahmed Ali (1910–1994), English, Urdu
Mulk Raj Anand (1905–2004), English
Chaudhry Afzal Haq (1891–1942), Urdu, English, Hindi
Manik Bandopadhyay (1908–1956), Bengali
Sharadindu Bandyopadhyay (1899–1970), Bengali
Bibhutibhushan Bandyopadhyay (1894–1950), Bengali
Tarashankar Banerjee (1898–1971), Bengali
D. R. Bendre (1896–1981), Kannada
Ramavriksha Benipuri (1899–1968), Hindi
Ruskin Bond (born 1934), English
Nitya Prakash (born 1988), English, Hindi
Buddhadeb Bosu (1908–1974), Bengali, English
Nirendranath Chakravarty (1924–2018), Bengali
Vikram Chandra (born 1961), English
Bankim Chandra Chatterjee (1838–1894), Bengali
Upamanyu Chatterjee (born 1959), English
Sharat Chandra Chattopadhyay (1876–1938), Bengali
Amit Chaudhuri (born 1962), English
Rajkamal Chaudhary (1929–1967), Hindi
Jibanananda Das (1899–1954), Bengali
Manoj Das (1934–2021), Oriya
David Davidar (born 1958)
Shobhaa De (born 1948), English
Anita Desai (born 1937), English
Kiran Desai (born 1971), English
P. L. Deshpande (1919–2000) Marathi
Eunice De Souza (1940–2017), English
Chitra Banerjee Divakaruni (born 1956)
Michael Madhusudan Dutta (1824–1873), Bengali, English, French
Lalon Fakir (c. 1772–1890), Bengali
Sunil Gangopadhyay (1934–2012), Bengali
Amitav Ghosh (born 1956), English
Subodh Ghosh (1909–1980), Bengali
Mir Mosharraf Hossain (1847–1912) Bengali
Raj Kamal Jha (born 1966), English
Amita Kanekar (born 1965), English
Umar Alisha Kavisekhara (1885–1945), Telugu
Datta Raghunath Kavthekar (1901–1979), Marathi
Prakash Kona (born 1967)
Kuvempu (1904–1994), Kannada
Jhumpa Lahiri (born 1967)
Pankaj Mishra (born 1969)
Piyush Jha (living), English
Rohinton Mistry (born 1952), English
Narendranath Mitra (1916–1975), Bengali
Gopinath Mohanty (1914–1991), Oriya
Jagadish Mohanty (1951–2013), Odia
Shirshendu Mukhopadhyay (born 1935), Bengali
Kiran Nagarkar (1942–2019) Marathi, English
R. K. Narayan (1906–2001), English
Bhalchandra Nemade (born 1938), Marathi
Dibyendu Palit (1939–2019), Bengali, English
Surender Mohan Pathak (born 1940), Hindi
Jaishankar Prasad (1889–1937), Hindi
Munshi Premchand (1880–1936), Hindi
Tushar Raheja (born 1984), English
Indra Bahadur Rai (1927–2018) Nepali
Rajashree, English
Raja Rao (1908–2006), English
Satyajit Ray (1921–1992), Bengali
Arundhati Roy (born 1961), English
Rammohan Roy (1772–1833), Bengali, English, Sanskrit
Salman Rushdie (born 1947), English
Sarojini Sahoo (born 1956) Odia
Rahul Sankrityayan (1893–1963), Hindi, Bhojpuri, Tibetan, Sanskrit
Vilas Sarang (1942–2015) Marathi, English
D. Selvaraj (1938–2009), Tamil
Samar Sen (1916–1987), Bengali, English
Fakir Mohan Senapati (1843–1918), Oriya
Durjoy Datta (born 1987), English
Vikram Seth (born 1952), author of A Suitable Boy
Rabindranath Tagore (1861–1941) Bengali also poet, painter, philosopher & Nobel laureate
Shashi Tharoor (born 1956), English
Chetan Bhagat (born 1971), English
Rajeeva Nayan Pathak (born 1972), English
Ishwar Chandra Vidyasagar (1820–1891) Bengali
Vijayakrishnan (born 1952), Malayalam
Kalki Krishnamurthy (1899–1954), Tamil
Sujatha (1935–2008), Tamil language
Lakshminath Bezbaroa (1864–1938), Assamese
Mamoni Raisom Goswami (1942–2011), Assamese, English
Bhabendra Nath Saikia (1932–2003), Assamese
Hiren Gohain (born 1939), Assamese
Nabakanta Barua (1926–2002), Assamese
Bishnu Prasad Rabha, Assamese
Kulpreet Yadav (born 1968), English
M. T. Vasudevan Nair (born 1933), Malayalam
Sudha Murthy (born 1950), Kannada, Marathi, English

Indonesia

Andrea Hirata (born 1967), Tetralogy of "Laskar Pelangi" (The Rainbow Troops)
Dewi Lestari (born 1976)
Pramoedya Ananta Toer (1925–2006), author of the banned 1980 novel This Earth of Mankind

Iraq

Ahmed Saadawi (born 1973), author of the award-winning Iraqi novel Frankenstein in Baghdad
Diaa Jubaili
Fouad al-Tikerly, best known for his novel al-Rajea al-Baeed, translated into English as The Long Way Back
Haifa Zangana (born 1950), in Baghdad
Hazim Kamaledin (born 1954), best known for his novel Desertified Waters, translated in Ducht as Schoonheid raast in mij tot ik sterf, Longlist International Prize for Arabic Fiction
Ibtisam Abdallah
Inaam Kachachi (born 1952)
Iqbal al-Qazwini
Samīra al-Māni'
Samuel Shimon
Selim Matar
Sinan Antoon

Iran

Ahmad Mahmoud (1931–2002)
Azar Nafisi (born 1948)
Bozorg Alavi (1904–1997)
Houshang Golshiri (1937–2000)
Jamal Mirsadeghi
Mahmud Doulatabadi (born 1930)
Reza Baraheni (born 1935)
Sadegh Hedayat (1903–1951)
Sadiq Chubak (1916–1998)
Shahrnush Parsipur (born 1946)
Simin Daneshvar (1921–2012)
Zoya Pirzad (born 1952)
Arash Hejazi (born 1971)
Abbas Maroufi (born 1957)
Shahryar Mandanipour (born 1957)
Jalal Al-e-Ahmad (1923-1969)

Ireland

Samuel Beckett (1906–1989)
James Joyce (1882–1941)
Flann O'Brien (1911–1966)
Oscar Wilde (1854–1900)

Israel

Shmuel Yosef Agnon (1888–1970), Nobel Prize winner; The Bridal Canopy, Yesteryear
Aharon Appelfeld, Badenheim 1939
Naomi Frankel (1918–2009), Shaul ve-Yohannah (Saul and Joanna) trilogy
David Grossman (born 1954), See Under: Love, The Smile of the Lamb
Yoram Kaniuk (1930–2013), His Daughter
Amos Oz (1939–2018), Black Box, My Michael
Yaakov Shabtai (1934–1981), Past Continuous
Meir Shalev (born 1948), The Blue Mountain, Esau
Michal Govrin (born 1960), The Name, Snapshots
Chaim Walder (born 1969), Kids Speak
Avraham B. Yehoshua (born 1936), A Late Divorce, Mr. Mani

Italy

Giulio Angioni (1939–2017)
Riccardo Bacchelli (1891–1985)
Alessandro Baricco (born 1958)
Giorgio Bassani (1916–2000)
Stefano Benni, journalist, poet, novelist, Terra (1985) is most popular work in English
Alberto Bevilacqua (1934–2013)
Vitaliano Brancati (1907–1954)
Gesualdo Bufalino (1920–19960
Aldo Busi (born 1948)
Dino Buzzati (1906–1972), Il deserto dei Tartari (1940)
Italo Calvino (1923–1985), Cosmicomics, If On a Winter's Night a Traveler (1979)
Luigi Capuana (1839–1915)
Andrea Camilleri (1925–2019)
Carlo Cassola (1917–1987)
Saveria Chemotti (born 1947)
Carlo Collodi (1826–1890)
Carmen Covito (born 1948)
Gabriele D'Annunzio (1863–1938)
Massimo D'Azeglio (1798–1866)
Edmondo De Amicis (1846–1908)
Grazia Deledda (1871–1936)
Umberto Eco (1932–2016)
Elena Ferrante
Beppe Fenoglio (né Giuseppe)
Antonio Fogazzaro (1842–1911)
Carlo Emilio Gadda (1893–1973)
Natalia Ginzburg (1916–1991)
Primo Levi (1919–1987), chemist and novelist
Emilio Lussu (1890–1975)
Alessandro Manzoni (1785–1873)
Dacia Maraini (born 1936)
Franco Mimmi (born 1942)
Elsa Morante (1912–1985)
Alberto Moravia (1907–1990)
Cesare Pavese (1908–1950)
Luigi Pirandello (1867–1936), playwright, Six Characters in Search of an Author
Vasco Pratolini (1913–1991)
Andrea di Robilant
Emilio Salgari (1862–1911)
Alberto Savinio (1891–1952)
Leonardo Sciascia (1921–1989)
Ignazio Silone (1900–1978)
Mario Soldati (1906–1999)
Italo Svevo (1861–1928)
Antonio Tabucchi (1943–2012), Pereira Declares (1994)
Susanna Tamaro (born 1957)
Giuseppe Tomasi di Lampedusa (1896–1957), The Leopard
Giovanni Verga (1840–1922)
Elio Vittorini (1908–1966)

Jamaica

Opal Palmer Adisa (born 1954)
Lindsay Barrett (born 1941)
Edward Baugh (born 1936)
James Berry (1924–2017)
Eliot Bliss (1903–1990)
Erna Brodber (born 1940)
Colin Channer (born 1963)
Kwame Dawes (born 1962)
Jean D'Costa (born 1937)
Nicole Dennis-Benn (born 1982)
John Edgar Colwell Hearne (1926–1994)
Nalo Hopkinson (born 1960)
Herbert de Lisser (1878–1944)
Roger Mais (1905–1955)
Claude McKay (1889–1948)
Pamela Mordecai (born 1942)
Geoffrey Philp (born 1958)
Velma Pollard (born 1937)
Patricia Powell (born 1966)
Victor Stafford Reid (1913–1987)
Joan Riley (born 1958)
Leone Ross (born 1969)
Andrew Salkey (1928–1995)
Olive Senior (born 1941)
Makeda Silvera (born 1955)
Elean Thomas (1947–2004)
Sylvia Wynter (born 1928)

Japan

Kōbō Abe (1924–1993)
Hiroyuki Agawa (1920–2015)
Sawako Ariyoshi (1931–1984)
Osamu Dazai (1909–1948)
Fumiko Enchi (1905–1986)
Shusaku Endo (1923–1996)
Ichiyō Higuchi (1872–1896)
Masuji Ibuse (1898–1993)
Kyōka Izumi (1873–1939)
Yasunari Kawabata (1899–1972) (Nobel Prize, 1968)
Natsuo Kirino (born 1951)
Yukio Mishima (1925–1970)
Kenji Miyazawa (1896–1933)
Minae Mizumura (born 1951)
Haruki Murakami (born 1949)
Ryū Murakami
Nisioisin (born 1981)
Kenzaburō Ōe (born 1935) (Nobel Prize, 1994)
Yōko Ogawa (born 1962)
Fuyumi Ono (born 1961)
Edogawa Rampo (1894–1965)
Hirotsu Ryurō (1861–1928)
Murasaki Shikibu
Junzo Shono (1921–2009)
Ayako Sono (born 1931)
Natsume Sōseki (1867–1916)
Jun'ichirō Tanizaki (1886–1965)
Shōtarō Yasuoka (1920–2013)
Banana Yoshimoto (born 1964)
Akira Yoshimura (1927–2006)
Junnosuke Yoshiyuki (1924–1994)

Kenya

Margaret Ogola (1958–2011)
Grace Ogot (1930–2015)
M. G. Vassanji (born 1950)
Ngũgĩ wa Thiong'o (born 1938), The River Between, Caitaani muthara-Ini, Matigari
Meja Mwangi (born 1948)
Isak Dinesen, pseudonym of Karen Blixen (1885–1962)

Korea

Kosovo

Sinan Hasani (1922–2010)
Teki Dervishi (1943–2011)
Rifat Kukaj (1938–2005)

Turkey (Kurds)

Bachtyar Ali (born 1960)
Jalal Barzanji (born 1953)
Yaşar Kemal (1923–2015)
Ata Nahai
Farhad Pirbal (born 1961)
Mehmed Uzun (1953–2007)

Latvia

Andrejs Upīts (1877–1970)
Marģeris Zariņš (1910–1993)
Aleksandrs Čaks (1901–1950)

Laos

Douangdeuane Bounyavong
Outhine Bounyavong
Daoviang Butnakho

Lebanon

Hanan al-Shaykh (born 1945)
Youssef Howayek (1883–1962), writer and sculptor
Elias Khoury (born 1948)
Amin Maalouf (born 1949)
Widad Sakakini (1913–1991)

Lesotho

Thomas Mofolo (1876–1948)

Luxembourg

Republic of Macedonia

Slavko Janevski (1920–2000)

Madagascar

Michèle Rakotoson (born 1948)
Jean-Joseph Rabearivelo (1901 or 1903–1937)

Malawi

Paul Tiyambe Zeleza (born 1955)
Felix Mnthali (born 1933)

Malaysia

K. S. Maniam (1942–2020)

Mali

Amadou Hampâté Bâ (1901–1991)
Aïda Mady Diallo
Doumbi Fakoly (born 1944)
Moussa Konaté (1951–2013)
Yambo Ouologuem (1940–2017)

Mauritania

Moussa Ould Ebnou (born 1956)

Mexico

Juan José Arreola
Nellie Campobello
Laura Esquivel
Carlos Fuentes
Elena Garro
Martín Luis Guzmán
José Emilio Pacheco
Octavio Paz
Juan Rulfo
Agustin Yanez
Jorge Ibargüengoitia
Homero Aridjis

Morocco

Mohamed Choukri (1935–2003)
Driss Chraïbi (1926–2007)
Edmond Amran El Maleh (1917–2010)
Abdelkebir Khatibi (1938–2009)
Mohammed Khaïr-Eddine (1941–1995)
Laila Lalami (born 1968)
Ahmed Sefrioui (1915–13 July 2004)
Mohamed Zafzaf (1945–2001)
Mohamed Leftah (1946–2008)

Mozambique

Paulina Chiziane (born 1955)
Mia Couto (born 1955)
Ungulani Ba Ka Khosa (born 1957)
Lina Magaia (1940–2011)

Nepal

Bishweshwar Prasad Koirala (1914–1982): Sumnima, Tin Ghumti, Hitlar Ra Yahudi.
Indra Bahadur Rai
Jagadish Ghimire (1946–2013): Lilam, Sabiti.
Khagendra Sangraula (born 1946): Chetanako Pahilo Dak, Amako Chhatapati, Junakiriko Sangit.
Laxmi Prasad Devkota (1909–1959)
Narayan Wagle
Parijat (writer) (1937–1993): Shirishko Phool (Blue Mimosa), Anido Pahadsangai, Paribhasit Ankhanharu.
Samrat Upadhyay
Sanu Sharma
Sarubhakta (born 1956)
Shrawan Mukarung
Subin Bhattarai (born 1982)

Netherlands

Ayaan Hirsi Ali (born 1969)
Harry Mulisch (1927–2010)
Multatuli (1820–1887)
Tip Marugg (1923–2006)
Cees Nooteboom (born 1933)
Willem Frederik Hermans (1921–1995)
Jan Wolkers (1925–2007)
Gerard van het Reve (1923–2006)
A.F.Th. van der Heijden (born 1951)

New Zealand

Barbara Anderson (1926–2013)
Catherine Chidgey (born 1970)
Joy Cowley (born 1936)
Nigel Cox (1951–2006)
Barry Crump (1935–1996)
Tessa Duder (born 1940)
Alan Duff (born 1950)
Kate Duignan (born 1974)
Janet Frame (1924–2004), author of An Angel at My Table
Maurice Gee (born 1931)
Patricia Grace (born 1937)
Keri Hulme (1947–2021)
Witi Ihimaera (born 1944)
Annamarie Jagose (born 1965)
Fiona Kidman (born 1940)
John A. Lee (1891–1982)
Ngaio Marsh (1895–1982)
Owen Marshall (born 1941)
Frederick Edward Maning (1812–1883)
Ronald Hugh Morrieson (1922–1972)
Rosie Scott (1948–2017)
Maurice Shadbolt (1932–2004)
C. K. Stead (born 1932)
Philip Temple (born 1939)
Julius Vogel (1835–1899)
Cherry Wilder (1930–2002)

Nicaragua

Gioconda Belli (born 1948)

Nigeria

Chinua Achebe (1930–2013)
Chimamanda Ngozi Adichie (born 1977)
Teju Cole (born 1975)
Cyprian Ekwensi (1921–2007)
Buchi Emecheta (1944–2017)
Helon Habila (born 1967)
Elnathan John (born 1982)
Flora Nwapa (1931–1993)
Chigozie Obioma (born 1986)
Ben Okri (born 1959)
Ken Saro-Wiwa (1941–1995)
Taiye Selasi (born 1979)
Lola Shoneyin (born 1974)
Wole Soyinka (born 1934)
Amos Tutuola (1920–1997)

Norway

Ingvar Ambjørnsen (born 1956)
Jens Bjørneboe (1920–1976)
Bjørnstjerne Bjørnson (1832–1910)
Johan Borgen (1902–1979)
Lars Saabye Christensen (born 1953)
Olav Duun (1876–1939)
Johan Falkberget (1879–1967)
Jostein Gaarder (born 1952), Sophie's World
Erik Fosnes Hansen (born 1965)
Knut Hamsun (1859–1952), Hunger
Sigurd Hoel (1890–1960)
Roy Jacobsen (born 1954)
Alexander Kielland (1849–1906)
Jan Kjærstad (born 1953)
Karl Ove Knausgård (born 1968)
Jonas Lie (1833–1908)
Erlend Loe (born 1969)
Gabriel Scott (1874–1958)
Dag Solstad (born 1941)
Sigrid Undset (1859–1952), Kristin Lavransdatter
Tarjei Vesaas (1897–1970)
Herbjørg Wassmo (born 1942)

Pakistan

Ahmed Ali, founder of Pakistan Academy of Letters, fiction writer, poet and scholar
Chaudhry Afzal Haq (1891–1942)
Tariq Ali (born 1943)
Musharraf Ali Farooqi (born 1968)
Zulfikar Ghose (born 1935)
Mohsin Hamid (born 1971)
Agha Shorish Kashmiri (1917–1975)
Saadat Hasan Manto (1912–1955), born in India
 Ali Akbar Natiq (born 1974) 
Uzma Aslam Khan
Kamila Shamsie (born 1973)
Bapsi Sidhwa (born 1938)
Abdullah Hussain (1920–2014)
Intizar Hussain (1923–2016)
Janbaz Mirza
Mustansar Hussain Tarar (born 1939)
Bano Qudsia
Ashfaq Ahmed (1925–2004)
Mumtaz Mufti (1905–1995)
Naseem Hijazi (c. 1914–1996)
Ibn-e-Safi
Ishtiaq Ahmed (c. 1941–2015)

Palestine

Panama

Paraguay

Renée Ferrer de Arréllaga (born 1944)
Augusto Roa Bastos (1917–2005)

Peru

Ciro Alegría (1909–1967)
José María Arguedas (1911–1969)
Manuel Scorza (1928–1983) 

Carlos Thorne (1923–2021)
Mario Vargas Llosa (born 1936) (Nobel Prize, 2010)

Philippines

Francisco Arcellana (1916–2002)
Lualhati Bautista (born 1945)
Carlos Bulosan (1913–1956)
Jose Dalisay (born 1954)
Eric Gamalinda (born 1956)
N. V. M. Gonzalez (1915–1999)
Jessica Hagedorn (born 1949)
Amado Hernandez (1903–1970)
Stevan Javellana (1918–1977)
Nick Joaquin (1917–2004)
Edgardo Reyes (1936–2012)
José Rizal (1861–1896)
Ninotchka Rosca (born 1946)
Bienvenido Santos (1911–1996)
Lope K. Santos (1879–1963)
Rogelio Sicat (1940–1997)
F. Sionil José (1924–2022)
Edilberto Tiempo (1913–1996)
Edith Tiempo (1919–2011)
Linda Ty-Casper (born 1931)

Poland

Maria Dąbrowska (1889–1965)
Tadeusz Dołęga-Mostowicz (1898–1939)
Tadeusz Konwicki (1926–2015)
Ignacy Krasicki (1735–1801)
Józef Ignacy Kraszewski (1812–1887)
Zofia Nałkowska (1885–1954)
Witold Gombrowicz (1904–1969)
Stanisław Lem (1921–2006)
Eliza Orzeszkowa (1841–1910)
Jan Potocki (1761–1815)
Bolesław Prus (1847–1912)
Władysław Reymont (1867–1925), Nobel Prize for Literature 1924, author of The Peasants
Bruno Schulz (1892–1942)
Henryk Sienkiewicz (1846–1916), Nobel Prize for Literature 1905, author of Quo Vadis
Gabriela Zapolska (1857–1921)
Stefan Żeromski (1864–1925)
Eugeniusz Żytomirski (1911–1975)

Portugal

Antonio Lobo Antunes (born 1942)
Agustina Bessa-Luís (1922–2019)
Camilo Castelo Branco (1825–1890)
Júlio Dinis (1839–1871)
Almeida Garrett (1799–1854)
Alexandre Herculano (1810–1877)
José Cardoso Pires (1925–1998)
Eça de Queirós (1845–1900)
José Saramago (1922–2010)

Puerto Rico

Giannina Braschi (born 1953), Yo-Yo Boing! (1998), and El imperio de los suenos/Empire of Dreams (1988).
Luis López Nieves (born 1950), Seva  (1984), Escribir para Rafa  (1987), La verdadera muerte de Juan Ponce de León  (2000), El corazón de Voltaire  (2005)

Romania

Gabriela Adameșteanu (born 1942)
Camil Baciu (1926–2005)
Maria Baciu (born 1942)
Max Blecher (1909–1938))
Nicolae Breban (born 1934)
Augustin Buzura (1938–2017)
Mateiu Caragiale (1885–1936)
George Călinescu (1899–1965)
Mircea Cărtărescu (born 1956)
Gheorghe Crăciun (1950–2007)
Mircea Eliade (1907–1986)
Mihai Eminescu (1850–1889)
Radu Pavel Gheo (born 1969)
Virgil Gheorghiu (1916–1992)
Panait Istrati (1884–1935)
Alexandru Ivasiuc (1894–1935)
Norman Manea (born 1936)
Gib Mihăescu (1894–1935)
Mircea Nedelciu (1950–1999)
Costache Negruzzi (1808–1868)
Hortensia Papadat-Bengescu (1876–1955)
Dora Pavel (born 1946)
Camil Petrescu (1894–1957)
Cezar Petrescu (1892–1961)
Dumitru Radu Popescu (born 1935)
Marin Preda (1922–1980)
Liviu Rebreanu (1885–1944)
Doina Ruști (born 1938)
Mihail Sadoveanu (1880–1961)
Zaharia Stancu (1902–1974)
Bogdan Suceavă (born 1969)
Duiliu Zamfirescu (1858–1922)

Russia

Andrey Bely (1880–1934)
Andrey Bitov (1937–2018)
Mikhail Bulgakov (1891–1940), author of The Master and Margarita
Nikolai Chernyshevsky (1828–1889), author of What Is To Be Done?
Fyodor Dostoyevsky (1821–1881), author of The Brothers Karamazov, Crime and Punishment
Gaito Gazdanov (1903–1971)
Nikolai Gogol (1809–1852), author of Dead Souls
Ivan Goncharov (1812–1891), Oblomov, a tale of a "superfluous" man
Maxim Gorky (1868–1936)
Anna Kashina, author of The Princess of Dhagabad
Mikhail Lermontov (1814–1841)
Leonid Leonov (1899–1994)
Nikolai Leskov (1831–1895)
Vladimir Makanin (1937–2017)
Vladimir Nabokov (1899–1977) early novels in Russian, later, including Lolita, in English.
Boris Pasternak (1890–1960), refused the Nobel Prize for Literature, Doctor Zhivago
Aleksandr Pushkin (1799–1837)
Viatcheslav Repin (born 1960), author of novels, short stories and essays in Russian and French
Mikhail Saltykov-Shchedrin (1826–1889)
Ilia Shtemler (born 1933)
Aleksandr Solzhenitsyn (1918–2008), One Day in the Life of Ivan Denisovich
Aleksey K. Tolstoy (1817–1875)
Aleksey N. Tolstoy (1883–1945)
Leo Tolstoy (1828–1910), author of War and Peace, Anna Karenina
Ivan Turgenev (1818–1883)

Saint Vincent and the Grenadines

 Phyllis Joyce McClean Punnett (1917–2004)

Samoa

Sia Figiel (born 1967)
Albert Wendt (born 1939)

São Tomé and Príncipe

Sara Pinto Coelho (1913–1990)

Senegal

Serbia

David Albahari
Ivo Andrić
Vladimir Arsenijević
Miodrag Bulatović
Miloš Crnjanski (1893–1977)
Dobrica Ćosić (1921–2014)
Jelena Dimitrijević (1862–1945)
Danilo Kiš (1935–1989)
Milorad Pavić
Borislav Pekić (1930–1992)
Isidora Sekulić (1877–1958)
Meša Selimović (1910–1982)
Srđan Srdić (born 1977)
Svetlana Velmar-Janković (1933–2014)

Sierra Leone

Syl Cheney-Coker (born 1945)
Aminatta Forna (born 1964)
Namina Forna (born 1987)

Slovakia

Slovenia

Somalia

Maxamed Daahir Afrax
Faarax M. J. Cawl (1937–1991)
Nuruddin Farah (born 1945)
Abdi Sheik Abdi (born 1942)
Waris Dirie (born 1965)

South Africa

Lionel Abrahams (1928–2004)
Peter Abrahams (1919–2017)
Elleke Boehmer (born 1961)
J. M. Coetzee (born 1940)
K. Sello Duiker (1974–2005)
Athol Fugard (born 1932)
Damon Galgut (born 1963)
Nadine Gordimer (1923–2014)
Bessie Head (1937–1986)
Christopher Hope (born 1944)
Cynthia Jele (living)
Fred Khumalo (born 1966)
Alex La Guma (1925–1985)
Mandla Langa (born 1950)
Christine Barkhuizen le Roux (1959–2020)
Arthur Maimane (1932–2005)
Zakes Mda (born 1948)
Kirsten Miller (living)
Lauretta Ngcobo (1931–2015)
Lewis Nkosi (1936–2010)
Alan Paton (1903–1988)
Olive Schreiner (1855–1920)
Sipho Sepamla (1932–2007)
Gillian Slovo (born 1952)
Zukiswa Wanner (born 1976)
Zoe Wicomb (born 1948)

South Korea

Spain

Leopoldo Alas (1852–1901)
Jesusa Alfau Galván de Solalinde (1895–1943)
Núria Añó (born 1973)
Camilo José Cela (1916–2002)
Miguel de Cervantes (1547–1616), Don Quixote
Pérez Galdós (1843–1920)
Juan Goytisolo (1931–2017)
Javier Marías (born 1951)
Juan Marsé (1933–2020)
Eduardo Mendoza (born 1943)
Antonio Muñoz Molina (born 1956)
Arturo Pérez-Reverte (born 1951)
Carlos Ruiz Zafón (born 1964)
Miguel de Unamuno (1864–1936)

Sri Lanka

Gunadasa Amarasekara (born 1929)
Anuk Arudpragasam (born 1988)
Arthur C. Clarke (1917–2008)
Romesh Gunesekera (born 1954)
Karunasena Jayalath (1928–1994) 
Shehan Karunatilaka (born 1975)
Rosalind Mendis (1903–1992)
Carl Muller (1935–2019)
Simon Navagattegama (1940–2005)
Michael Ondaatje (born 1943), The English Patient
Shyam Selvadurai (born 1965)
W. A. Silva (1890–1957) 
S. J. Sindu (born 1987) 
Ambalavaner Sivanandan (1923–2018)
Martin Wickremasinghe (1890–1976)

Sudan

Leila Aboulela (born 1964)
Ibrahim Ishaq (1946–2021)
Rania Mamoun
Ra'ouf Mus'ad, also connected with Egypt
Tayeb Salih (1929–2009)
Sabah Sanhouri (born 1990

Sweden

Stig Dagerman (1923–1954)
Marianne Fredriksson (1927–2007)
Gustaf Fröding (1860–1911)
Erik Gustaf Geijer (1783–1847)
Jan Guillou (born 1944)
Eyvind Johnson (1900–1976)
Pär Lagerkvist (1891–1974)
Selma Lagerlöf (1858–1940), Nobel Prize for Literature 1909, author of The Wonderful Adventures of Nils (novel), The Emperor of Portugallia
Astrid Lindgren (1907–2002)
Henning Mankell (1948–2015)
Harry Martinson (1904–1978)
Vilhelm Moberg (1898–1973)
Peter Pohl (born 1940)
Hjalmar Söderberg (1869–1941)
Esaias Tegnér

Switzerland

Friedrich Dürrenmatt (1921–1990), The Quarry
Max Frisch (1911–1991), Stiller (1954) (I'm Not Stiller), Mein Name sei Gantenbein (1964)
Christian Kracht (born 1966)

Republic of China|Taiwan

Pai Hsien-yung (born 1937)
Sanmao (1943–1991)

Tanzania

Mark Behr, also connected with South Africa (1963–2015)
Nahida Esmail
Euphrase Kezilahabi (1944–2020)
Aniceti Kitereza (1896–1981)
Abdulrazak Gurnah (born 1948)
Peter K. Palangyo (1939–1993)

Gabriel Ruhumbika (born 1938)

Edwin Semzaba

Togo

Jeannette D. Ahonsou (born 1954)

Gad Ami
Theo Ananissoh (born 1962)
David Ananou (1917–2000)
Richard Dogbeh, also connected with Benin, Senegal and Ivory Coast (1932–2003)
Kossi Efoui (born 1962)
Christiane Akoua Ekué (born 1954)

Trinidad and Tobago

André Alexis (born 1957
Lisa Allen-Agostini (born 1960s)
Michael Anthony (born 1930)
Robert Antoni (born 1958)
Dionne Brand (born 1953)
Ralph de Boissière (1907–2008)
Ramabai Espinet (born 1948)
Rosa Guy (1922–2012) 
Merle Hodge (born 1944)
Kevin Jared Hosein (born 1986)
C. L. R. James (1901–1989)
Barbara Jenkins
Marion Patrick Jones (1931–2016)
Anthony Joseph (born 1966
Earl Lovelace (born 1935)
Shiva Naipaul (1945–1985)
V. S. Naipaul (1932–2018)
Elizabeth Nunez
Lakshmi Persaud
M. NourbeSe Philip (born 1947)
Monique Roffey (born 1965)
Lawrence Scott (born 1943)
Samuel Selvon (1923–1994)
Elizabeth Walcott-Hackshaw (born 1964)

Tunisia

Hédi Bouraoui (born 1932)
Aïcha Chaibi
Faten Fazaâ
Sophie el Goulli (1932–2015)

Hubert Haddad (born 1947)
Khawla Hamdi (born 1984)
Albert Memmi (1920–2020)
Amel Mokhtar (born 1964)

Mustapha Tlili (1937–2017)

Turkey

Ahmet Hamdi Tanpınar, author of Saatleri Ayarlama Enstitüsü, Huzur
Ahmet Ümit, author of Beyoğlu Rapsodisi
Ayşe Kulin (born 1941)
Aziz Nesin (1915–1995)
Buket Uzuner (born 1955)
Elif Şafak (born 1971
Haldun Taner (1915–1986)
Halit Ziya Uşaklıgil, author of Mai ve Siyah, Aşkı Memnu
Hasan Ali Toptaş (born 1958)
Kemal Tahir, author of Yorgun Savaşçı, Devlet Ana, Karılar Koğuşu
Metin Kaçan (1961–2013)
Oğuz Atay (1934–1977), author of Tutunamayanlar
Oktay Rifat (1914–1988)
Orhan Kemal (1923–2015), author of Bekçi Murtaza,
Orhan Pamuk, Nobel Prize author of My Name Is Red and The White Castle
Reşat Nuri Güntekin (1889–1956)
Rıfat Ilgaz (1911–1993)
Sabahattin Ali (1907–1948), author of Kuyucaklı Yusuf, Kürk Mantolu Madonna
Sevim Burak (1931–1983)
Sabri Gürses (born 1972)
Yahya Kemal (1884–1958)
Yaşar Kemal (1923–2015), author of Mehmed, My Hawk
Yunus Nadi Abalıoğlu (1879–1945)
Yusuf Atilgan, author of Anayurt Oteli, Aylak Adam

Uganda

Jane Bakaluba (born 1939)

Violet Barungi (born 1943)
Dilman Dila
Arthur Gakwandi
Moses Isegawa (born 1963)
Godfrey Kalimugogo (1943–2015)
Catherine Samali Kavuma (born 1960)
China Keitetsi (born 1976)
Goretti Kyomuhendo (born 1965)
Bonnie Lubega (born 1929)
Jennifer Nansubuga Makumbi (born 1960s)
Ivan Matthias Mulumba

Glaydah Namukasa
Julius Ocwinyo (born 1961)
Kakwenza Rukirabashaija (born 1988)
Eneriko Seruma (born 1944)

Lillian Tindyebwa
Nick Twinamatsiko
Timothy Wangusa (born 1942)

Ukraine

Larisa Alexandrovna (born 1971)
Emma Andijewska (born 1931)
Eugenia Chuprina (born 1971)
Markiyan Kamysh (born 1988
Andrey Kurkov (born 1961)
Yaroslav Melnyk (born 1959)
Israel Orenstein (1831–1905)
Halyna Pahutiak (born 1958)
Mykhailo Stelmakh (1912–1983)
Serhiy Zhadan (born 1974)

United Kingdom

England

Scotland

Wales

English language

Mary Balogh (born 1944)
Amy Dillwyn (1845–1935)
Ken Follett (born 1949)
Richard Hughes (1900–1976), A High Wind in Jamaica
Jack Jones (1884–1970)
Richard Llewellyn (1907–1983), How Green Was My Valley
Stephen Maybery (born 1949)
Jean Rhys (1890–1979)
Bernice Rubens, author of A Solitary Grief
Howard Spring (1889–1965)

Welsh language

Daniel Owen (1836–1895)
Eigra Lewis Roberts (born 1939)
Kate Roberts (1891–1985)

Northern Ireland

Colin Bateman (born 1962), Divorcing Jack
Ronan Bennett (born 1956), The Catastrophist
Joyce Cary (1888–1957), The Horse's Mouth
Paul Kearney (born 1967), Monarchies of God
Benedict Kiely (1919–2007)
Bernard MacLaverty (born 1942), Cal
Brian Moore (1921–1999), The Lonely Passion of Judith Hearne
Flann O'Brien (1911–1966), The Third Policeman
Amanda McKittrick Ross (1860–1939)

United States

Uruguay

Eduardo Galeano (1940–2015), writer and social commentator.
Mario Benedetti (1920–2009), Uruguay's best-known novelist
Jorge Majfud (born 1969)
Juan Carlos Onetti (1909–1997)
Horacio Quiroga (1878–1937)
Juana de Ibarbourou (1892–1979)
Maria Eugenia Vaz Ferreira (1875–1924)
Delmira Agustini (1886–1914)
Isidore Lucien Ducasse (1846–1870), born in Montevideo though French by nationality
José Enrique Rodó (1871–1917), considered by many to have been Spanish America's greatest philosopher

Venezuela

Alfredo Armas Alfonzo (1921–1990)
Rufino Blanco Fombona (1874–1944)
Mario Briceño Iragorry (1897–1958)
Manuel Díaz Rodríguez (1871–1927)
Mercedes Franco (born 1948)
Alicia Freilich (born 1939)
Rómulo Gallegos (1884–1969)
Salvador Garmendia (1928–2001)
Adriano González León (1931–2008)
Francisco Herrera Luque (1927–1991)
Boris Izaguirre (born 1965)
Eduardo Liendo (born 1941)
Francisco Massiani (1944–2019)
Guillermo Meneses (1911–1978)
Miguel Otero Silva (1908–1985)
Julián Padrón (1910–1964)
Teresa de la Parra (1889–1936)
Mariano Picón Salas (1901–1965)
Arturo Uslar Pietri (1906–2001)

Vietnam

Dương Thu Hương (born 1947) Paradise of the Blind
Pham Thi Hoai (born 1960)
Phung Le Ly Hayslip (born 1949) When Heaven and Earth Changed Places
Bao Ninh (born 1952)

Yiddish

Sholom Asch (1880–1957)
David Bergelson (1884–1952)
Der Nister (1884–1950)
Shira Gorshman (1906–2001)
Chaim Grade (1910–1982)
Esther Kreitman (1891–1954)
Mendele Moykher Sforim (1836–1917), pseudonym for Sholem Yankev Abramovitch
Joseph Opatoshu (1886–1954)
Yitzok Lebesh Peretz (1852–1915)
Sholem Aleichem (1859–1916) (real name: Solomon Rabinovitz), Fiddler on the Roof was based on his stories
Isaac Bashevis Singer (1904–1991)
Israel Joshua Singer (1893–1944)
Anzia Yezierska (c. 1880–1970)

Zimbabwe

Tsitsi Dangarembga (born 1959)	
Chenjerai Hove (1956–2015)
Doris Lessing, born in Persia, now Iran (1919–2013)
Dambudzo Marechera (1952–1987)
Nozipa Maraire (born 1966)
Charles Mungoshi (1947–2019)
Solomon Mutswairo (1924–2005)
Alexander McCall Smith, also connected with Botswana (born 1948)
Stanlake Samkange (1922–1988)
Yvonne Vera, also connected with Canada (1964–2005)

References